Thinking Out Loud is the seventh studio album by guitarist Frank Gambale, released in 1995 through Victor Entertainment and reissued on 24 April 2001 through Samson Records.

Critical reception

Scott Yanow at AllMusic awarded Thinking Out Loud two stars out of five. He described it as "sounding unexpectedly close to George Benson", but Gambale's compositions were criticised as weak ("funky but without soul or any worthwhile melodies") and Dave Weckl's performances as "remarkably dull automatic pilot drumming".

Track listing

Personnel
Thinking Out Loud is credited to the following:
Frank Gambale – composition, guitar, mixing, production
Libby Lavella – vocals
Otmaro Ruíz – keyboard (tracks 1, 7, 9)
David Goldblatt – keyboard (tracks 2, 4–6, 8)
Brian Auger – Hammond organ
Dave Weckl – drums
Walfredo Reyes, Jr. – percussion
Tim Landers – bass (tracks 1, 5, 6, 8, 9)
Alphonso Johnson – bass (tracks 2–4, 7, 10)
Robert M. Biles – engineering, mixing
Matt Stephens – engineering assistance
Tony Flores – engineering assistance
Alan Yoshida – mastering
Akira Taguchi – executive production

References

External links

Frank Gambale albums
1995 albums
Victor Entertainment albums